B. giganteus may refer to:

 Bathynomus giganteus, the giant isopod, the largest known isopod species
 Blaberus giganteus, the giant cockroach, one of the world's longest roach species
 Brachystephanus giganteus, a plant species found in Cameroon and Equatorial Guinea
 Burhinus giganteus, a large shorebird widespread around coasts from the Andaman Islands to Australia